Wallhausen may refer to the following places in Germany:

Wallhausen, Baden-Württemberg, in the district of Schwäbisch Hall
Wallhausen, Rhineland-Palatinate, in the district of Bad Kreuznach 
Wallhausen, Saxony-Anhalt, in the district of Mansfeld-Südharz
Konstanz-Wallhausen, a ward of the city of Konstanz, Baden-Württemberg.